Hannes Jaenicke (born 26 February 1960 in Frankfurt am Main) is a German actor, voice actor, audiobook narrator, and author. He has played in various television-programs and movies, including Lost Treasure.

After he was born, Jaenicke and his family moved to Pittsburgh, Pennsylvania. They remained there until he was ten years old.

Selected filmography
 Out of Order (Abwärts, 1984), as Pit
  (1986), as Leslie
 Rosa Luxemburg (1986), as Kostja Zetkin
 Väter und Söhne – Eine deutsche Tragödie (TV miniseries, 1986), as Max Bernheim
  (1987), as Melting
 Bei Thea (TV film, 1988), as David Adler
 Silence Like Glass (Zwei Frauen, 1989)
 Tam Tam oder Wohin die Reise geht (TV film, 1989), as Rolf Burglehn
 High Score (1990), as Hara
 Das Haus am Watt (TV film, 1990), as Max Golborn
  (TV film, 1990), as Gunther
 The Tigress (1992), as Harry
 By Way of the Stars (TV miniseries, 1992), as Otto von Lebrecht
 Tödliche Lüge (TV film, 1993), as Dieter Sladko
  (Die Sieger, 1994), as Heinz Schaefer
 Der Räuber mit der sanften Hand (TV miniseries, 1995), as Siegfried Dennery
 Catherine the Great (TV film, 1996), as Peter III of Russia
  (1996), as Aleksej
  (TV film, 1996), as Dr. Klaus Stern
 Knockin' on Heaven's Door (1997), as Motorcycle cop
 Bandits (1997), as Police commissioner Schwarz
 Code Red (1997, TV film), as Stefan Beckman
  (1998, TV film), as Markus Voss
 The White Raven (1998), as Albert Dockmonish
 Five Aces (1999), as Hustler
 Free Fall (TV film, 1999), as Michael Ives
 Active Stealth (1999), as Rifkin
  (1999), as Lt. Pritch
 Restraining Order (1999), as Martin Ritter
  (1999), as Ted
  (2001), as Julian Beck
 Venomous (2001), as Dr. Eric Foreman
 Pretend You Don't See Her (TV film, 2002), as Curtis Caldwell Blake
  (2002), as Jack McKendrick
  (TV film, 2002), as Wolfgang Herling
 Half Past Dead (2002), as Agent Hartmann
  (TV film, 2002), as Count Jaschinsky
 Lost Treasure (2003), as Ricaro Arterra
 Blast (2004), as CEO Heller
  (2004, TV film), as Sebastian Krüger
 Post Mortem (TV series, 17 episodes, 2007–2008), as Dr. Daniel Koch
  (TV film, 2007), as Harald Westphal
  (2009), as Ralf
  (TV film, 2009), as Harald Westphal
 Ein Date fürs Leben (TV film, 2009), as Gregor Weller
  (TV film, 2011), as Harald Westphal
  (TV series, 1 episode, 2011), as Günther Patzak
  (TV film, 2011), as Gilles Broca
  (TV film, 2011), as Mike Mason
  (TV film, 2011), as Tom Jaeger

Written works
 Wut allein reicht nicht. Wie wir die Erde vor uns schützen können. Publisher: Gütersloher Verlagshaus, Gütersloh 2010, .
 Die große Volksverarsche. Wie Industrie und Medien uns zum Narren halten. Publisher: Gütersloher Verlagshaus, Gütersloh 2013, 
 Wer der Herde folgt, sieht nur Ärsche. Warum wir dringend Helden brauchen. Publisher: Gütersloher Verlagshaus, Gütersloh 2017,

Audiobooks
 Ian Fleming: Goldfinger, publisher: Random House Audio, 2005,  
 Roger Graf: Philip Maloney, 3 rätselhafte Fälle, publisher: Edition Hörbuch, 2006, 
 Michael Crichton: Gold: Pirate Latitudes, publisher: Random House Audio, 
 read by the author: Wer der Herde folgt, sieht nur Ärsche: Warum wir dringend Helden brauchen, publisher: Headroom Sound Production, 2017,

References

External links

Hannes Jaenicke in the German Dubbing Card Index

1960 births
Living people
German male television actors
German male film actors
20th-century German male actors
21st-century German male actors